The Bunila is a left tributary of the river Cerna in Romania. It discharges into the Cerna near Hășdău.

References

Rivers of Romania
Rivers of Hunedoara County